"Gone" is a song recorded by American country music singer Dierks Bentley. It was released on October 22, 2020 as the first of two standalone singles referred to as "Covid holdover songs". The song was written by Nicolle Galyon, Ben Johnson and Niko Moon, and produced by David Garcia.

Background
Bentley released "Gone" during the COVID-19 pandemic, and said: “We are all relying on lyrics and melodies at home and trying however we can to find different ways to connect with our fans, so that they know how important they still are to us.” “I hope this song resonates with mine, and I’m counting the days until we can all be back together again, beers in the air.”

Music video
Bentley said: “It just always ends poorly for me in this video,” “I definitely had a lot more fun making it than it looks though…we got to film a bunch of scenes inspired by some of my favorite shows like The Office, MacGyver, Game of Thrones and Full House. And I got to collaborate with some new directors I’ve never worked with, so I left at the end of a really long day feeling really happy and inspired about a kind of sad song.”

The video was co-directed by Wes Edwards and Ed Pryor with contributing guest directors Travis Nicholson, Running Bear and Sam Siske.

Commercial performance
"Gone" peaked at number 26 on the Billboard Hot 100, Dierk's highest charting position there since his debut single "What Was I Thinkin'", as well as second highest of his career. It also peaked at number two on Billboard Country Airplay chart dated June 12, 2021, and remained there for four weeks, having been blocked from the top by Luke Combs's "Forever After All".

Personnel
Credits by AllMusic

Dierks Bentley - lead vocals
Dave Cohen - keyboards
Fred Eltringham - drums
David Garcia - background vocals
Krystal Garcia - background vocals
Jedd Hughes - electric guitar
Ben Johnson - programming
Rob McNelley - electric guitar
Russ Pahl - pedal steel guitar
Jimmie Lee Sloas - bass guitar
Bryan Sutton - acoustic guitar, dobro, mandolin
Derek Wells - electric guitar

Charts

Weekly charts

Year-end charts

Certifications

References

2020 singles
2020 songs
Capitol Records Nashville singles
Dierks Bentley songs
Songs written by Nicolle Galyon
Songs written by Niko Moon